Mogilvskiy Avtomobilny Zavod imeni S. M. Kirova, abbreviated MoAZ, (/), is an automotive and earth-moving equipment manufacturer located in the city of Mogilev, Belarus. MoAZ has been a subsidiary of BelAZ since 2006. In 1958 MoAZ was named in honor of Sergey Kirov, an early Bolshevik leader in the Soviet Union.

History

The company was founded in 1935 as Workshop. In 1941 the plant was evacuated to Kuibyshev, where engines for the attack aircraft IL-2 were produced.

After World War II the plant was returned to Mogilev and produced locomotives, steam-powered machinery, overhead cranes, and tank lorries based on GAZ-51 lorries. In 1958 the factory started the production of the single-axle MAZ-529, developed by the Minsk Automobile Plant (MAZ). 

In 2006 the factory became a branch of JSC "BelAZ", which has been a branch of "BelAZ-Holding" since 2012. Most MoAZ vehicles are exported; more than 85% of the produced vehicles are sold in CIS member states.

Current products

 Self-propelled scrapers (MoAZ-6014);
 Loaders (MoAZ-40484);
 Dump trucks (MoAZ-7505, MoAZ-7529);
 Underground trains (MoAZ-7405-9586);
 Lorries (MoAZ-049, MoAZ-060, MoAZ-070);
 Motorized rollers (MoAZ-6442-9890);
 Wheeled bulldozers (MoAZ-40486, MoAZ-40489);
 Electric cars (EC-1.00);
 Tractors (MoAZ-49011);
 Airdrome trucks (MoAZ-7915);
 Engineering tractors for the Belarus Army.

References

External links 

MoAZ home page (Belarusian)
BelAZ's MoAZ home page (Russian)

BelAz gallery, in Russian
The fullest technical information. 3D models BELAZ

Truck manufacturers of the Soviet Union

Rolling stock manufacturers of Belarus
Truck manufacturers of Belarus
Manufacturing companies established in 1935
Vehicle manufacturing companies established in 1948
1948 establishments in Belarus
1948 establishments in the Soviet Union
Mogilev
Minsk Automobile Plant vehicles
Belarusian brands
Soviet brands